Troy Kepper (born February 22, 1982) is an American rower who has competed successfully at elite level winning the men's coxed pairs at the 2009 World Rowing Championships in Poznań. This followed his second place at the 2005 World Rowing Championships in Gifu.

References

1982 births
American male rowers
World Rowing Championships medalists for the United States
Living people
Pan American Games medalists in rowing
Pan American Games gold medalists for the United States
Rowers at the 2007 Pan American Games
Medalists at the 2007 Pan American Games